In Japanese mahjong, yaku is a condition that determines the value of the player's hand. It is essential to know the yaku for game strategy, since a player must have a minimum of one yaku in their hand in order to legally win a hand. Each yaku has a specific han value. Yaku conditions may be combined to produce hands of greater value. The game also features dora, that allow a hand to add han value, but that cannot count as yaku. Altogether, a hand's points value increases exponentially with every han a hand contains.

Overview 
Yaku are somewhat similar to poker hands. They fit certain patterns based on the numbers or types of tiles included, as well as the relative value of the tiles.  Unlike poker, however, multiple hand types may be combined to produce hands of greater value.

Yaku is divided into three categories:
 Hands that are mandatory to be closed (menzen-nomi, 門前のみ).
 Hands that loses one han if the hand is open ("Eat and decrease", a literal translation of kuisagari, 喰い下がり)
 Hands that can be closed or open and has the same han value.

Calling for another player's discard to make a meld makes the meld and the hand open. When a winning tile of a closed hand is a discard, the meld including that discard is considered open, while the hand is still regarded as closed. If a hand is closed, the situation is called "menzenchin (門前清)" or "menzen (門前)" in Japanese.

The basic concept of a yaku is that it fits into one of three basic criteria:
 It contains a pattern of some kind
 It can consistently be formed during a game, although it does not necessarily need to be common
 It is based on specific game situations, such as discards or actions taken by other players

Finally, when it comes to points scoring, the total number of han in the hand is counted. When the han value is four or less, fu is also counted. The combination of the han value and fu value corresponds to a points table.

List of yaku 
The following is a list of all the yaku, their names in English and Japanese, their han values, and any special conditions related to them.  They are listed here in groups according to the underlying patterns that define the yaku. Example hands are given, but they are often not the only possible hands with that yaku. All yaku can be divided into seven basic categories, depending on the dominant feature.  The features are as follows: patterns based on sequences, patterns based on triplets and/or quads, consistency of the type and numbers of the tiles, lucky circumstances, and special criteria.

Special criteria

Yaku based on luck 
These hands are all worth one han.

Yaku based on sequences

Yaku based on triplets and/or quads 
When the following hands involve triplets, quads are also acceptable, while if they require quads, triplets do not count.  Each yaku is worth two han, regardless of whether the hand is closed or open.

Yaku based on terminal or honor tiles
These hands involve terminals and/or honors, or lack thereof, such as tan'yao and yakuhai due to their simplicity.

Yaku based on suits 
The following two yaku are related to a single suit. They both lose one han when they are open.

Yakuman hands 

There is a special set of hands so difficult to attain that they are worth the limit of points just for having them. The limit value, along with the hands themselves, are called yakuman (役満, or yaku-mangan 役満貫). All yakuman hands override all other han values,  while some hands can themselves be combined to form multiple yakuman. Some conditions on the limit hands can render themselves double the value, or called daburu yakuman (ダブル役満).

Yaku can also be formed into a yakuman, otherwise known as kazoe-yakuman (数え役満), or counted yakuman, which consist of yaku hands and dora tiles that adds up to a minimum 13 han.

The thirteen orphans, four closed triplets and big three dragons are considered relatively easy to complete among yakuman hands and are collectively called "the three big families of yakuman" (Japanese: 役満御三家).

Some of yakuman hands may have respective names in some regions. The names used here mostly come from American publications, which are based on Chinese translations.

Yakuman on opening hands
The following are yakuman hands completed on the first go-around.

Ancient or local yaku
The following table details yaku and yakuman hands that are usually not recognized as valid but may appear in house rules.

References

External links
European Mahjong Association's Riichi Ruleset

See also 
Mahjong
Japanese Mahjong scoring rules

Mahjong